See You in Hell is the debut studio album by British heavy metal band Grim Reaper, released on the independent record label Ebony Records in 1983. The album cover was designed by Garry Sharpe-Young.

The title track was ranked No. 38 on VH1's 40 Most Awesomely Bad Metal Songs Ever countdown.
According to vocalist Steve Grimmett in a 1984 interview, "Dead on Arrival" is about his friendship with Brian Field who was involved with the Great Train Robbery .

Track listing
All tracks by Nick Bowcott and Steve Grimmett, except "The Show Must Go On" by Bowcott and Paul DeMercado

Personnel
Grim Reaper 
Steve Grimmett - vocals
Nick Bowcott - guitar
Dave Wanklin - bass
Lee Harris - drums

Production
Darryl Johnston - producer, engineer
Ebony Artists management - management 
Garry Sharpe - sleeve design

Charts

References

1983 debut albums
Grim Reaper (band) albums
RCA Records albums